The Honda CL450 was the dual sport or "scrambler" model of Honda's  DOHC parallel-twin engined motorcycle. It was the sister bike to the Honda CB450; the differences between the models were mostly cosmetic, with the CL450 having off-road-style high-level exhaust pipes and braced handlebars, for instance.

History
Initially available in kit form for the 1967 CB450, it was officially released in 1968 as the CL450K1 "Scrambler" in silver, candy red and candy blue colors (only the tank and air filter covers were painted). This year also saw the addition of a 5-speed gearbox, an upgrade from the older 4-speed.

The CL450 remained much the same through 1974, though diverged further from its sister bike as time went on.  While the CB450 went to a front disc brake in 1970, Honda decided to keep the CL450 with its two drum brakes. Disc brakes were fairly new technology on motorcycles, and unproven in off-road riding. The CB450 was replaced in 1975 when Honda increased the displacement of the engine and renamed it the CB500.

The bike remains popular today among enthusiasts, and many are still in use in flat track racing or have been modified into cafe racers.

Design
The CL450's horsepower rating was 43hp at 9,650 RPM off the crank, nearly 100hp per liter. Top speed could be seen as high as 96 MPH in stock trim with a well tuned carburetor. If highway speeds are more desirable, the CB450's gearing can be used to offer more relaxed cruising at higher velocities. Vibration was a complaint, so Honda added rubber mounted handle bars to overcome this to a degree. The CL450 wasn't nearly as mass-produced as the smaller 350–360cc versions.

CL450
Dual-sport motorcycles
Motorcycles introduced in 1968